Meat dress may refer to:

 Vanitas: Flesh Dress for an Albino Anorectic, created in 1987 by artist Jana Sterbak
 Lady Gaga's meat dress, worn at the 2010 MTV Video Music Awards